Mount Hagen (German: Hagensberg), named after the German colonial officer Curt von Hagen (1859–1897), is the second highest volcano in Papua New Guinea and on the Australian continent, ranking behind only its neighbour Mount Giluwe which is roughly  to the south-west.

Mount Hagen is an old stratovolcano which has been heavily eroded during several Pleistocene glaciations.  The maximum extent of the glaciers on Hagen was less than half that on the much higher Mount Giluwe, covering an area of up to 50 km² (20 mi²)  and extending down below 3,400 m (11,000 ft).

See also
Volcanic Seven Summits

References

External links
 

Stratovolcanoes of Papua New Guinea
Mountains of Papua New Guinea
Hiking in Papua New Guinea
Enga Province
Western Highlands Province
Pleistocene stratovolcanoes